The year 1880 in archaeology involved some significant events.

Explorations
 William Matthew Flinders Petrie travels to Egypt and conducts a survey of the Great Pyramid of Giza.

Excavations
 Nicolay Nicolaysen excavates the Gokstad ship in Norway.
 Heinrich Schliemann begins excavation around the Tomb of Minyas at Orchomenus (Boeotia).

Finds
 The foundations of a convent, first erected in 670, discovered at Minster in Kent.
 Varvakeion Athena.
 The mandible of a Neanderthal child is discovered in a secure context in Šipka cave in the Austro-Hungarian Empire (modern-day Czech Republic) associated with cultural debris including hearths, Mousterian tools and bones of extinct animals.

Publications
 Marcelino Sanz de Sautuola and Juan Vilanova y Piera publish their initial findings on the paintings in the Cave of Altamira, suggesting to initial scepticism that they are of the Paleolithic period.
 The Journal of Hellenic Studies begins publication.

Births
 April 11 – Julio C. Tello, Peruvian archaeologist (d. 1947)
 April 17 – Leonard Woolley, British archaeologist of Mesopotamia (d. 1960)

Deaths

References

Archaeology
Archaeology by year
Archaeology
Archaeology